"Can't Sleep, Can't Eat, I'm Sick / Ningyo" is a song by Japanese singer Namie Amuro from her eighth studio album Play (2007). It was released as a single on May 17, 2006, by Avex Trax, as the album's second single. Although she has had Japanese song titles prior to signing with Avex Trax, "Ningyo" or "人魚" which means mermaid, is her first with the label. "Can't Sleep, Can't Eat, I'm Sick" is featured on the album Play, although the latter A-side, "Ningyo" or "人魚", was excluded.

Background
In 1994 Amuro appeared in the drama "Toki wo Kakeru Shoujo" which used the original "Ningyo" as its ending theme song.

During the release of Queen of Hip-Pop (2005) to "White Light / Violet Sauce" (2005), Namie predominantly worked with producer/songwriter, Nao'ymt. This single reunites her with producers T.Kura and Michico who crafted many of her early R&B hits in 2003. "Can't Sleep, Can't Eat, I'm Sick," produced by the pair has been described as a funky summer dance tune. The other a-side, "Ningyo," is a cover of Japanese artist, Nokko, who made the song a massive hit in 1994, and is a theme song of TV drama "Toki o Kakeru Shojo" in which Amuro played a younger sister of Yuki Uchida who is a leading actor.

For the production of the music video for "Can't Sleep, Can't Eat, I'm Sick", Namie teamed up with American choreographer Shawnette Heard. Shawnette Heard has danced and choreographed routines for many of the world's biggest musical artists including Christina Aguilera, Janet Jackson, Michael Jackson, Madonna, Ricky Martin, Mýa, and many more.

On May 17, 2006, along with the release of the single her complete solo catalog was released to iTunes Japan. Immediately afterwards, "Can't Sleep, Can't Eat, I'm Sick" and "Ningyo" ranked #4 and #6 respectively.

Commercial endorsements
"Can't Sleep, Can't Eat, I'm Sick" was used in commercials for ringtone service sites, Mu-Mo and Iromelo Mix DX. "Ningyo" was also used in commercials for Mu-Mo.

Music video
The promotional video for "Can't Sleep, Can't Eat, I'm Sick" debuted on music channel, VMC on May 1, 2006. Directed by longtime collaborator, Masashi Muto, the video focuses entirely on a dance routine choreographed by Shawnette Heard. It is also reminiscent of Kylie Minogue's "Can't Get You Out of My Head" (2001) as a majority of it is filmed in a dark room entirely adorned in lights. It was also filmed on top of a skyscraper roof engulfed in lights from the skyscrapers in the background. The video was named VMC's "Video of the Month" for May and was played in heavy rotation on the channel.

A promotional video for "Ningyo" was also filmed and premiered on the music video outlet M-ON on May 9, 2006. Based on the story of The Tale of the Bamboo Cutter, the video begins with a shot of a full moon that morphs into window. The window opens to show Amuro sitting on a rock before a mural. It transitions to a scene of her on a bridge grasping the moon from the sky. For the final scene, Amuro is again sitting in a dense bamboo forest before the window closes. The video ends with her becoming part of the mural in the opening scene. The video is unlike any of Amuro's previous videos as it portrays her in a distinctly Japanese manner.

Track listing

Personnel

"Can't Sleep, Can't Eat, I'm Sick"
Namie Amuro – vocals
Michico – background vocals
Producers – T.Kura & Michico
Arranger – T.Kura
Choreographer – Shawnette Heard
Director – Masashi Muto

"Ningyo"
Namie Amuro – vocals
Nao'ymt – background vocals
Producers – Nao'ymt
Arranger – Nao'ymt
Director – Masashi Muto

Live performances
 Can't Sleep, Can't Eat, I'm Sick
 May 11, 2006 – Utaban
 May 15, 2006 – Hey! Hey! Hey!
 May 19, 2006 – Music Station
 May 20, 2006 – CDTV
 May 26, 2006 – Music Fighter
 May 28, 2006 – MTV VMAJ 2006 Red Carpet Show
 June 5, 2006 – SMAPxSMAP
 September 25, 2006 – Hey! Hey! Hey! 13th Year Special

Charts

Chart positions

Certification

References

External links
 VMC "Video of the Month"

2006 singles
Namie Amuro songs
Songs with music by Kyōhei Tsutsumi
2005 songs
Avex Trax singles